The Clearwater River is a river in Douglas County of the U.S. state of Oregon.

There are two notable waterfalls along the river. Upstream is Clearwater Falls, and downstream a few miles is Whitehorse Falls, the smaller of the two.

See also 
List of rivers of Oregon

References

External links
 Clearwater Falls: Northwest Waterfall Survey
 Whitehorse Falls: Northwest Waterfall Survey

Rivers of Oregon
Rivers of Douglas County, Oregon
Waterfalls of Oregon